The Peruvian treehunter (Thripadectes scrutator) or buff-throated treehunter, is a species of bird in the family Furnariidae.It is found in Bolivia and Peru. Its natural habitat is subtropical or tropical moist montane forest.

References

Peruvian treehunter
Birds of the Peruvian Andes
Peruvian treehunter
Taxa named by Władysław Taczanowski
Taxonomy articles created by Polbot